Roncadelle is a comune in the province of Brescia, in Lombardy.

The Lombard party Pro Lombardy Independence has the municipal councillor in this town, since 2011.

Twin towns
Roncadelle is twinned with:

  Zavidovići, Bosnia and Herzegovina

References

Cities and towns in Lombardy